The  (lit. Central Tōhoku Expressway) is a 2-laned national expressway in the Tōhoku region of Japan. It is owned and operated by East Nippon Expressway Company and Ministry of Land, Infrastructure, Transport and Tourism (MLIT). The expressway is numbered E13 under the MLIT's "2016 Proposal for Realization of Expressway Numbering."

Overview

The expressway is incomplete in many areas, however it is planned to eventually be a continuous route spanning northern Fukushima, Yamagata, and southern Akita prefectures. As of July 2019, all gaps in the expressway are in the process of being eliminated, with all gaps in Fukushima set to be removed by March 2021. North of the city of Shinjō, various expressway-standard roads (bypasses of National Route 13) make up the remaining distance to the city of Yokote in Akita Prefecture.

The route of the expressway parallels the Ōu Main Line of East Japan Railway Company for most of its length.

The speed limit is 70 km/h along the majority of the route, there are short 80 km/h sections between Yonezawa-kita and Yonezawa-Hachimanbara interchanges and Higashine and Higashine-kita interchanges.

History
The first section of the Tōhoku-Chūō Expressway to open was between Yonezawa-kita and Yonezawa-Hachimanbara interchanges on 21 November 1997. Since then the road has gradually been extended by adding short extensions.

List of major junctions
PA - parking area, SA - service area, SIC - smart interchange, TB - toll gate

|colspan="8" style="text-align: center;"| through to

See also
Yuzawa-Yokote Road

References

External links 

 East Nippon Expressway Company

Expressways in Japan
Proposed roads in Japan
Roads in Akita Prefecture
Roads in Fukushima Prefecture
Roads in Yamagata Prefecture